The Argosy Foundation, founded in 1997, is currently based in Milwaukee, Wisconsin. It was formerly known as the Abele Family Charitable Trust.

History
The foundation was established in 1995 with a $9 million endowment from John Abele. In 2002, it was reported that the foundation would move to Milwaukee with a net worth of over $450 million and that it had a history of supporting "liberal social and environmental causes." It was also reported that the foundation trustees were the five members of the Abele family: Chris, Alex, Jennifer, John Abele, and his wife.

Grantees
These are among the grants awarded:
 2012 award of 1.2 million dollars to Olin College of Engineering
 2013 award of 70,000 to a San Francisco company, Energy Foundation, which has been linked to a conservative-based super PAC the Congressional Leadership Fund
 2013 award of 100,000 dollars to Conservation Law Foundation
 2013 award of 65,000 dollars to Forestethics
 2013 award of 20,000 dollars to Center for Biological Diversity
 2013 award of 300,000 dollars to the Rocky Mountain Institute
 2012 award of 250,000 dollars to For Inspiration and Recognition of Science and Technology

See also
 Bradley Foundation
 Bader Philanthropies
 Zilber Family Foundation

References

External links

https://www.citizenaudit.org/943294950/

Foundations based in the United States
Organizations based in Milwaukee
1997 establishments in Wisconsin